Raivo Tamm may refer to:
 Raivo E. Tamm, Estonian actor and politician
 Raivo Tamm (military personnel), Estonian military personnel